Neil Thomas (born c. 1940) was a Canadian football player who played for the Winnipeg Blue Bombers. He won the Grey Cup with them in 1962. He played college football at Hillsdale College in Hillsdale, Michigan. He was drafted by the Denver Broncos in the 1962 American Football League Draft.

References

1940s births
Winnipeg Blue Bombers players
Hillsdale College alumni
Living people